The National Park System of the United States is the collection of physical properties owned or administered by the National Park Service. The collection includes all national parks and most national monuments, as well as several other types of protected areas of the United States.

As of December 2022, there are  units of the National Park System. However, this number is somewhat misleading. For example, Denali National Park and Preserve is counted as two units, since the same name applies to a national park and an adjacent national preserve. Yet Jean Lafitte National Historical Park and Preserve is counted as one unit, despite its double designation. Counting methodology is typically based on the language of a park's authorizing legislation.

Although the designations generally reflect sites' features, all units of the system are considered administratively equal and with few exceptions the designations themselves do not define their level of protection. Each site has a management plan consistent with its ecological, historic, and recreational resources and its enabling legislation.

In addition to areas of the National Park System, the National Park Service also provides technical and financial assistance to several affiliated areas authorized by Congress. Affiliated areas are marked on the lists below.

National Park System units are found in all 50 states, the District of Columbia, and the U.S. territories of Guam, American Samoa, the U.S. Virgin Islands, and Puerto Rico. (The territory of the Northern Mariana Islands has an affiliated area but not an official NPS unit.)

Nearly all units managed by the National Park Service participate in the National Park Passport Stamps program.

National parks
There are 63 officially designated national parks in the United States and its dependent areas, as of 2021. The national parks are considered the "crown jewels" of the system and are typically larger than other areas, including a variety of significant ecological and geological resources.

Former national parks

National monuments

There are 129 national monuments, 84 of which are administered by the NPS and are listed below. Of these, 83 (all except Grand Canyon-Parashant) are NPS official units.
The remaining 46 monuments are administered by five other federal agencies. Two, Grand Canyon–Parashant and Craters of the Moon National Monuments, are jointly administered by the NPS and the Bureau of Land Management, and Tule Lake National Monument is joint with the Fish and Wildlife Service. National monuments are typically smaller and protect just one or few major resources. They include both natural and historical sites and can be established by the president under the Antiquities Act.

Former national monuments

National preserves

There are 21 national preserves in the United States, 19 of which are counted by the National Park System as official units. Ten are stand-alone official units, while eleven others are designated areas where hunting or grazing is permitted as part of a larger "national park and preserve" or "national monument and preserve". Nine of those are counted as separate units, while Oregon Caves National Monument and Preserve and New River Gorge National Park and Preserve are single units (there is no functional difference). Jean Lafitte National Historical Park and Preserve is not officially a national preserve but has similar management policies, while Salt River Bay National Historical Park and Ecological Preserve is unrelated.

National historical parks

There are 63 national historical parks.

Authorized national historical parks

National historic sites

There are 84 national historic sites, of which 74 are NPS units, 9 are affiliated areas, and one, Grey Towers National Historic Site, is managed by the U.S. Forest Service (not listed here).

Former national historic sites

Authorized national historic sites

International historic site

National battlefield parks

National military parks

Former national military parks

National battlefields

National battlefield site

Former national battlefield sites

National memorials

There are 31 national memorials that are NPS units and five affiliated national memorials.

Former national memorials

Authorized national memorials

National recreation areas

There are 18 national recreation areas administered by the National Park Service. Another 22 national recreation areas are administered by the Forest Service and Bureau of Land Management.

Former or transferred national recreation areas

National seashores

There are 10 national seashores.

National lakeshores

There are three national lakeshores, located in Michigan and Wisconsin.

Former national lakeshores

National rivers and national wild and scenic rivers

There are four national rivers (marked with an asterisk) and ten national wild and scenic rivers administered as distinct units of the National Park System. There are many more national wild and scenic rivers that run through other units.

Former national rivers

National reserves

National reserves are partnerships between federal, state, and local authorities. Within the boundaries of the three national reserves are combinations of federal land (Park Service or National Wildlife Refuges), state parks and forests, local public lands, and private properties. Two national reserves are currently managed as official units.

National parkways

Ten roadways and surrounding scenic areas are managed by the NPS as parkways, four of which as official units and five as part of other units.

National historic and scenic trails

These National Park Service trails are part of the larger National Trails System. Only three of the trails are considered official units of the park system.

National cemeteries

Most national cemeteries are administered by the Department of Veterans Affairs, although a few are managed by the National Park Service and the U.S. Army. None of the cemeteries are considered official units of the system; they are all affiliated with other parks.

Transferred national cemeteries

National heritage areas

The National Park Service provides limited assistance to national heritage areas, but does not administer them.

Other NPS protected areas and administrative groups

There are 11 NPS units of other designations, as well as other affiliated areas. The National Mall and National Capital Parks have many sites, some of which are also units of other designations.

In addition, there are sites where the NPS is authorized to provide financial and technical assistance to local authorities for interpretive or educational purposes, but do not have the right to acquire land or have a say in land use or zoning. These include the 55 National Heritage Areas, as well as National Commemorative Sites such as Quindaro Townsite or the Kennedy-King National Commemorative Site. There are also various administrative groups of listed parks, such as Manhattan Sites, National Parks of New York Harbor, and Western Arctic National Parklands. The NPS also owns conservation easements (but not the land itself) for part of the area called the Green Springs National Historic Landmark District.

Former other areas

In the 1930s and 1940s, the NPS developed dozens of recreational demonstration areas, most of which eventually became national or state parks.

See also
 List of the United States National Park System official units (the )
 List of fee areas in the United States National Park System
 List of all national parks of the world
 List of U.S. state parks
 National Park Passport Stamps
 List of National Natural Landmarks
 List of tourist attractions worldwide

References

 Bureau Historian (2006). "Former National Park System Units: An Analysis" .
 National Park Service. "National Monument Proclamations under the Antiquities Act"
 National Park Service Office of Public Affairs (2009). "UNITS & RELATED AREAS & RELATED AREAS IN THE NATIONAL PARK SYSTEM". Last updated January 13, 2017. (Lists 317 NPS units and related areas by classification).

External links

 Alphabetical list of places at the National Park Service website
 Former National Park System Units: An Analysis 
 National Park Service
 National Park System Units by type
 National Park Foundation
 Parks by Date of Establishment
 America's Hidden Treasures, an essay on the lesser known National Parks
  The National Park Travelers Club - an organization of individuals attempting to visit all units of the NPS

 01
Areas
Areas in NPS
NPS
NPS
NPS
NPS
NPS
Park
NPS
NPS
NPS
NPS
01